This is a list of notable events in country music that took place in the year 1972.

Events
 March — For the first time since 1967, Sonny James fails to hit the No. 1 spot on Billboard's Hot Country Singles Chart with a single release. His hit, "Only Love (Can Break a Heart)" stops at No. 2. James' record streak would hold for more than 14 years, until Alabama scored its 17th-straight with "40 Hour Week (For a Livin')" in August 1985. "The Southern Gentleman" would return to the No. 1 spot twice more during 1972 — "That's Why I Love You Like I Do" (a retitled remake of his 1957 hit, "You're the Reason I'm in Love," the lesser-known flip side of "Young Love"; and also his last major hit with Capitol Records); and "When the Snow is on the Roses."
 During 1972, James inks a recording deal with Columbia Records; "When the Snow..." is his first hit with his new label.
 March — Merle Haggard is pardoned by California Gov. Ronald Reagan for his 1957 robbery; which had landed him a prison term that lasted two-and-a-half years.
 April — The first Fan Fair is held in Nashville, Tennessee.
 June 3 — The Opryland USA country music theme park opens in Nashville.
 June 13 — The Country Music Foundation Library and Media Center is dedicated.
 September — The premiere issue of Country Music magazine hits the newsstand. The magazine, which will be issued monthly (later bi-monthly), is an immediate hit with critics and readers.
 September 17 — Faron Young — who has international success with "It's Four in the Morning" — is charged with assault for spanking a girl in the audience at a concert in Clarksburg, West Virginia after claiming she spat on him. Young appeared before a Wood County, West Virginia justice of the peace and was fined $24, plus $11 in court costs.  It is the first in a string of incidents involving Young, whose increasingly bizarre behavior would begin overshadowing his success.
 October — The Country Music Association moves from NBC to CBS, where it remained until 2006 when the awards show moved to ABC. Loretta Lynn becomes the first woman to win the CMA's Entertainer of the Year award.

No dates
 The Nitty Gritty Dirt Band, a California-based country-folk-rock band, releases their landmark album Will the Circle Be Unbroken. The album of folk and country standards, recorded in Nashville alongside traditional country artists, is a huge critical and commercial success. Two additional volumes would be released in 1989 and 2002.
 Music and Billboard chart historian Joel Whitburn releases "Top Country Songs 1944–1971." The book, published by Record Research, marks the first time a listing of every song and artist that had ever appeared by means of a country and western hit parade had been compiled into a single volume. Eight more updated volumes will follow (the most recent edition covers through 2017), as well as two editions focusing on strictly those songs reaching the Top 40 (the original released in 1996, and an updated version in 2006).
 Buck Owens returns to his musical roots when Jerry Brightman is added on pedal steel for records and tours.

Top hits of the year

Number one hits

United States
(as certified by Billboard)

Notes
1^ No. 1 song of the year, as determined by Billboard.
2^ Song dropped from No. 1 and later returned to top spot.
A^ First Billboard No. 1 hit for that artist.
B^ Last Billboard No. 1 hit for that artist.
C^ Only Billboard No. 1 hit for that artist to date.

Canada
(as certified by RPM)

Notes
2^ Song dropped from No. 1 and later returned to top spot.
A^ First RPM No. 1 hit for that artist.
B^ Last RPM No. 1 hit for that artist.
C^ Only RPM No. 1 hit for that artist.

Other major hits

Singles released by American artists

Singles released by Canadian artists

Top new album releases

Other top albums

Christmas albums
The Johnny Cash Family Christmas — Johnny Cash (Columbia)

Births
 February 23 — Steve Holy, 2000s (decade) country singer best known for his No. 1 hit "Good Morning Beautiful."
 April 5 — Pat Green, "Texas country"-styled singer/songwriter.
 July 17 — Paul Brandt, Canadian country singer who began enjoying U.S. success in the late 1990s.
 August 16 — Emily Robison, member of the Dixie Chicks (she plays the guitar, banjo and dobro).
 October 23 — Jimmy Wayne, singer-songwriter of the 2000s (decade).
 October 28 — Brad Paisley, new traditionalist of the 2000s (decade).

Deaths
January 28 — T. Texas Tyler, 55, 1940s country star best known for "The Deck of Cards."
June 23 — Elton Britt, 59, 1940s country star best known for "There's a Star-Spangled Banner Waving Somewhere."
July 16 – Charlie Chamberlain, 61, Canadian Country Singer, who was the Male vocalist for Don Messer's Islanders from the band's inception in 1933 until shortly before his death (Heart Attack).

Country Music Hall of Fame Inductees
Jimmie Davis (1899–2000)

Major awards

Grammy Awards
Best Female Country Vocal Performance — "The Happiest Girl in the Whole USA", Donna Fargo
Best Male Country Vocal Performance — Charley Pride Sings Heart Songs, Charley Pride
Best Country Performance by a Duo or Group with Vocal — "Class of '57", The Statler Brothers
Best Country Instrumental Performance — Charlie McCoy/The Real McCoy, Charlie McCoy
Best Country Song — "Kiss an Angel Good Morning", Ben Peters (Performer: Charley Pride)

Juno Awards
Country Male Vocalist of the Year — Stompin' Tom Connors
Country Female Vocalist of the Year — Myrna Lorrie
Country Group or Duo of the Year — Mercey Brothers

Academy of Country Music
Entertainer of the Year — Roy Clark
Song of the Year — "The Happiest Girl in the Whole USA", Donna Fargo (Performer: Donna Fargo)
Single of the Year — "The Happiest Girl in the Whole USA", Donna Fargo
Album of the Year — The Happiest Girl in the Whole USA, Donna Fargo
Top Male Vocalist — Merle Haggard
Top Female Vocalist — Donna Fargo
Top Vocal Group — The Statler Brothers
Top New Male Vocalist — Johnny Rodriguez
Top New Female Vocalist — Tanya Tucker

Country Music Association
Entertainer of the Year — Loretta Lynn
Song of the Year — "Easy Loving", Freddie Hart (Performer: Freddie Hart)
Single of the Year — "The Happiest Girl in the Whole USA", Donna Fargo
Album of the Year — Let Me Tell You About a Song, Merle Haggard
Male Vocalist of the Year — Charley Pride
Female Vocalist of the Year — Loretta Lynn
Vocal Duo of the Year — Conway Twitty and Loretta Lynn
Vocal Group of the Year — The Statler Brothers
Instrumentalist of the Year — Charlie McCoy
Instrumental Group of the Year — Danny Davis and the Nashville Brass

Further reading
Kingsbury, Paul, "The Grand Ole Opry: History of Country Music. 70 Years of the Songs, the Stars and the Stories," Villard Books, Random House; Opryland USA, 1995
Kingsbury, Paul, "Vinyl Hayride: Country Music Album Covers 1947–1989," Country Music Foundation, 2003
Millard, Bob, "Country Music: 70 Years of America's Favorite Music," HarperCollins, New York, 1993
Whitburn, Joel, "Top Country Songs 1944–2005 – 6th Edition." 2005.

Other links
Country Music Association
Inductees of the Country Music Hall of Fame

References

External links
Country Music Hall of Fame

Country
Country music by year